Otto Kruger (September 6, 1885 – September 6, 1974) was an American actor, originally a Broadway matinee idol, who established a niche as a charming villain in films, such as Hitchcock's Saboteur. He also appeared in CBS's Perry Mason and other TV series. He was the grandnephew of South African president Paul Kruger.

Early life and education
Born in Toledo, Ohio, Kruger was of German descent. He was the son of Bernard Alben Kruger and Elizabeth Winers Kruger and the grandnephew of South African pioneer and president Paul Kruger.

Otto was musically trained, but switched careers and became an actor after studying engineering at the University of Michigan.

Career
Making his Broadway debut in 1915, Kruger quickly became a matinee idol. Though he started to get noticed in the early 1920s, it was the 1930s when his career was at its height. His sound film debut came in Turn Back the Clock (1933) and he made an appearance in the film Chained (1934).

Though he played the hero on occasion, for most of his career, he played the main villain or a charming or corrupt businessman. One of his best known roles was in the Douglas Sirk film Magnificent Obsession (1954).  Kruger played the supporting role of Judge Percy Mettrick, who unsuccessfully urges Will Kane to leave town in High Noon (1952).  Kruger is also remembered for playing the villain Tobin in Alfred Hitchcock's spy film Saboteur (1942) and mob boss Stevens in the film noir 711 Ocean Drive (1950).

His television roles included those of Dr. Mumford in the 1959 episode "Experiments in Terror" of the NBC science fiction/adventure series The Man and the Challenge,  as Ben Tully in "Gun City" of the ABC western series, The Rebel, as Franklyn Malleson Ghentin in the 1961 episode "A Fool for a Client" of James Whitmore ABC's legal drama, The Law and Mr. Jones, and as Karl in the episode "Quite a Woman" of the short-lived 1961 CBS series The Investigators starring James Franciscus. 

Kruger made four guest appearances on CBS's Perry Mason. In his first two appearances, "The Case of the Grumbling Grandfather" (1961) and "The Case of the Counterfeit Crank" (1962), he was cast as Mason's client, and in both episodes was the title character. In his final appearance, he played Judge Norris in "The Case of the Missing Button" (1964).

Personal life, later years and honors
On March 20, 1920, Kruger married Broadway actress Susan "Sue" MacManamy.  Their daughter, Ottilie Kruger (1926–2005), was also an actress and was the first wife of pioneering cinematographer Gayne Rescher.

Kruger supported Thomas Dewey in the 1944 United States presidential election.

Kruger died at the Motion Picture and Television Country House in Woodland Hills, California, on his 89th birthday.

Kruger was honored with two stars on the Hollywood Walk of Fame; one for TV and one for film.

Partial list of appearances on radio
Kruger appeared as Mr. Hardecker in "After Dinner Story" (airdate October 26, 1943; story by Cornell Woolrich) from the Suspense radio program series.

Filmography

Television

The Nash Airflyte Theater (November 23, 1950) in "Suppressed Desires"
Lights Out (1951) as Carlton Dane 
Lux Video Theatre (1955-1956) as Host
The Rebel (1959) as Ben Tully 
Perry Mason (1961-1964) as Judge Norris/Timothy Balfour Sr./August Dalgran/J. J. Gideon
The Law and Mr. Jones (1961) as Franklyn Malleson Ghent 
Frontier Circus (1961) as General Frederic Jellich
The Investigators (1961) as Karl (episode "Quite a Woman")
Thriller (1962) as Bert Farrington 
Checkmate (1962) as George Emory
Dr. Kildare (1962) as Louis Conrad 
Bonanza (1963) as Judge Whitaker

Notes

External links

 
 
 

1885 births
1974 deaths
American people of German descent
American male film actors
American male silent film actors
American male stage actors
20th-century American male actors
Burials at Forest Lawn Memorial Park (Hollywood Hills)
Male actors from Toledo, Ohio
American male television actors
University of Michigan College of Engineering alumni